Fort White (Zomi: Thangmual) was a small military station built by the British Army under Field Marshal Sir George Stuart White, V.C., Commander-in-Chief of Upper Burma during their third expeditions in the annexation of the Chin Hills in 1889. Its location was on the eastern (leeward) side of the Letha Range midway between Kale and Tiddim towns in what is now the Tiddim Township of Chin State, Burma (Myanmar).

History of the name 
It was named after Field Marshal Sir George White, a British Army officer known for his campaigns in South Asia.

Plan 
It was garrisoned and a post and telegraph office was established there on 13 January, 1889, to be linked with their rearward, Kalemyo of Sagaing Division, and other parts of the country down to Rangoon.

During World War II 
During the second World War, it was reduced to ashes by air-raids and shelling with heavy guns from the Allied Forces at mount Kennedy, yet it was not restored after the end of the war, since it had to be swerved off by the new Kale-Tiddim motor car road from the old one intersecting it. It has been deserted ever since the British
colonial government had left.

There had been a heliograph station, too, on a horn of the Letha range near it to the west of the stockade at a distance of about four furlongs. It belonged to the Chin Hills Bn (BFF) of Falam to be communicated with other outstation such as, Kalemyo, No. 3 Stockade (Natang), Dimlo-Tiddim, Lungpi-Falam and Haka. Later on, it
was occupied by a detachment of the Allied Force until just before the Japanese army stormed the fort of White and it was razed to the ground in the war.

The Fort White post and telegraph office was the transit office of the whole Chin Hills connected with Kale, Tiddim, Haka and Falam offices.

It has a temperate climate but the temperature usually drops below freezing point in the months from November to February every year.

Its natural vegetation is evergreen and the land is good for grazing mithuns and sheep that Major M.C. Moore, Commanding Officer of the Chin Hills Bn. Reared sheep, kept jersey bulls and stallions for mating with the indigenous females.

Notwithstanding its fame, there does not appear to be a photograph of Fort White still in existence.

People 
This fort is an important historic spot in the Chin Hills. So it was painted by artist Daniel Son za Howe from his memory as exactly as he saw it in his boyhood when he frequented there for sightseeing and authenticated by

Ex. Hav. Ngaw Khup, 90, of Khuasak
U E. Pau Za Kam, 85, retired State Education Officer, Khuasak and
U Hau za Kimlai, 83, retired State Forest Officer, Buanman
who in their living memory, had lived there for many years and they are still vividly familiar with all the scenic spots there and in the neighbourhood.

The Zomi called 
A graveyard which the Zomi called, "The White Cemetery" where the British pioneer soldiers killed in action against the Chins (Zomi) in their occupation of the Siyin valley were buried is situated in the north about a mile away from it. The British ranking officers interred there include Major Gordon Cunning and Major Stevens.

Buildings and structures in Chin State
Forts in Myanmar